Lord Mountbatten: The Last Viceroy is a British television series which first aired on ITV in 1986. It depicts Lord Mountbatten's time as Supreme Commander, South-East Asia in the Second World War, and then as Viceroy of India shortly after the war in the days leading up to Indian independence. The Film was shot in Sri Lanka.

Main cast
 Nicol Williamson ...  Lord Louis Mountbatten
 Janet Suzman ...  Edwina Mountbatten 
 Dreya Weber  ... Pamela Mountbatten
 Wendy Hiller ... Princess Victoria of Hesse and by Rhine 
 A.K. Hangal ...  Sardar Vallabhbhai Patel 
 Owen Holder ...  King George VI 
 David Lyon ...  Lt Col Vernon Erskine-Crum 
 Patrick Allen ...  Claude Auchinleck 
 Michael Byrne ...  George Abell 
 Sam Dastor ...  Mahatma Gandhi 
 Derek Reed	... Patrick Spens
 Nigel Davenport ...  Hastings Ismay, 1st Baron Ismay 
 David Quilter ...  Alan Campbell Johnson 
 Ian Richardson ...  Jawaharlal Nehru 
 Nadim Sawalha  ... Liaquat Ali Khan 
 Tony Wredden   ... Maulana Abul Kalam Azad
 Saloni Kaur  ... Indira Gandhi (née Nehru)
 Sumant Mastakar ... C. Rajagopalachari
 Nitin Sethi ... Rajendra Prasad
 John Rolfe ...  Clement Attlee 
 Zia Mohyeddin ... V. P. Menon
 Vladek Sheybal ...  Muhammad Ali Jinnah 
 Jeremy Sinden ...   Ronald Brockman
 Nana Patekar ...Nathuram Godse   
 Malcolm Terris ...  Winston Churchill 
 Minnie Boga ... Amrit Kaur
 Roger Hammond ... Cyril Radcliffe
 Sushma Seth ... Vijaya Lakshmi Pandit
 Villoo Kapadia ... Fatima Jinnah

See also
 List of artistic depictions of Mahatma Gandhi

References

External links

1980s British drama television series
ITV television dramas
1986 British television series debuts
1986 British television series endings
Films shot in Sri Lanka
Television shows set in India
Television shows set in England
Television shows set in the British Raj
Cultural depictions of George VI
Cultural depictions of Jawaharlal Nehru
Cultural depictions of Mahatma Gandhi
Cultural depictions of Indira Gandhi
Cultural depictions of Winston Churchill
Cultural depictions of Louis Mountbatten, 1st Earl Mountbatten of Burma
Cultural depictions of Muhammad Ali Jinnah
Cultural depictions of Vallabhbhai Patel
Partition of India in fiction
Works about the Mahatma Gandhi assassination
Films directed by Tom Clegg (director)